Yamoussa Camara (born 26 April 2000) is a Guinean professional footballer who plays for Energetik-BGU Minsk.

References

External links 
 

2000 births
Living people
Guinean footballers
Guinean expatriate footballers
Expatriate footballers in Belarus
Guinean expatriate sportspeople in Belarus
Association football midfielders
Belarusian Premier League players
FC Rukh Brest players
FC Smorgon players
FC BATE Borisov players
FC Isloch Minsk Raion players
FC Energetik-BGU Minsk players